Ypsolopha dorsimaculella is a moth of the family Ypsolophidae first described by William D. Kearfott in 1907. It is found throughout North America. In Canada, it is known from British Columbia, Alberta and Saskatchewan. It is known from most of the continental United States. The habitat consists of mixed wood forests, riparian areas and possibly scrubland.

The wingspan is 18.5–19.5 mm. Adults are on wing from June to August. Adults are of a uniform, drab colour.

References

Ypsolophidae
Moths of North America